Dambaru Sisa (Odia: ଡମ୍ବରୁ ସୀସା) is an Indian politician, social worker and first Bonda Member of Chitrakonda.

Early life and education 
Sisa is born to a Bonda family on 28 March 1980 at the village Khuriguda, Malkangiri district, Odisha.

Sisa earned his Bachelor of Science with Mathematics Honours from DAV College, Koraput. Later he did post graduation studies in Math (MSc. Math) and Law (LLM).

Career
At the age of 33, Sisa became 10th Member of Legislative Assembly of Chitrakonda, First Bonda MLA in Odisha.

Assembly membership
Member of Odisha Legislative Assembly from 2014 to date. Elected from Chitrakonda and contested from Biju Janata Dal party.

Recognition

References

External links
 Bondas, a primitive tribe in Odisha hills, get their first MLA
 First Bonda MLA, Odisha Suntimes
 First Bonda tribe MLA in Odisha Assembly Press Trust Of India, Bhubaneswar, Odisha
 Bonda Tryst With Democracy, Hindustan Times, Odisha
 Why I hope #AchheDin won’t reach Andaman’s primitive Jarawas, Wordly Ties
 MLA Profile at CM, Odisha Website
 First Primitive Tribe BONDA MLA, Press Reader, Lucknow, Uttar Pradesh

1980 births
Living people
People from Malkangiri district
Members of the Odisha Legislative Assembly
Biju Janata Dal politicians